Vondie Curtis-Hall is an American actor, screenwriter, film director, and television director. As an actor, he is known for his role as Dr. Dennis Hancock on the CBS medical drama Chicago Hope created by David E. Kelley and as Ben Urich in the Netflix TV series Marvel's Daredevil. He wrote and directed the cult film Gridlock'd.

Early life
Curtis-Hall was born in Detroit, Michigan, the son of Angeline, a nurse, and Curtis Hall, a construction company owner.

Designer Kevan Hall is the brother of Vondie. They also have a sister, Sherrie. All of them attended Presentation Our Lady of Victory grade school in Detroit where they were taught by the Oblate Sisters of Providence, the only all black order of nuns in the United States.

Career
Initially a stage actor, Curtis-Hall was a member of the original cast of the Broadway musical Dreamgirls. He originated the role of Marty, James "Thunder" Early's original manager. Curtis-Hall has appeared in numerous films including One Good Cop, Passion Fish, Sugar Hill, Coming To America, Crooklyn, Drop Squad, Eve's Bayou, Turn It Up and William Shakespeare's Romeo + Juliet. His credits as a director include the films Gridlock'd, Glitter, Redemption: The Stan Tookie Williams Story, Waist Deep, as well as episodes of television shows The Shield, Firefly, Chicago Hope, and MDs. In 2000, Vondie Curtis-Hall and Danny Glover (who portrayed Marty in the film adaptation of Dreamgirls) both appeared in the TNT made-for-television movie Freedom Song. In 2019 Curtis-Hall appeared in the film Harriet, where, according to one reviewer, "Vondie Curtis-Hall gives one of the finest performances of his long career as Reverend Green."

He has had recurring roles on TV series such as Soul Food, I'll Fly Away, and ER. His one-time role as a suicide patient on ER earned him an Emmy Award nomination for Outstanding Guest Actor in a Drama Series; later in that series he appeared in a recurring role as Roger McGrath.

His most prominent television role as an actor to date is as supporting character Dennis Hancock on the medical drama Chicago Hope. Curtis-Hall portrayed Ben Urich in the Netflix series Daredevil. He also appeared in an episode of The Sopranos.

Personal life
He is married to actress/director Kasi Lemmons, and they have a son and three daughters. He is also a full-time arts professor at New York University Tisch School of the Arts.

Filmography

Actor

Director

References

External links
 
 
 
 

African-American male actors
African-American film directors
African-American television directors
American male stage actors
American male television actors
American television directors
American male film actors
Living people
Male actors from Detroit
Film directors from Michigan
20th-century American male actors
21st-century American male actors
20th-century African-American people
21st-century African-American people
Year of birth missing (living people)